A sand beach is a beach consisting primarily of sand.

Sand Beach may also refer to:

Canada
 Sand Beach, Nova Scotia

United States
 Sand Beach, Pennsylvania
 Sand Beach Township, Michigan
 Sand Beach Church, in Owasco, New York
 Sand Beach in Acadia National Park, Bar Harbor, Maine

See also
 Sandy Beach (disambiguation)
 Beach (disambiguation)
 Sand (disambiguation)